Reactivity may refer to:

 Reactivity (chemistry), the rate at which a chemical substance tends to undergo a chemical reaction
 Reactive programming, a property of an execution model whereby changes are automatically propagated through a dataflow network
 Reactivity (psychology)
 Reactivity (electronics)
 Reactivity of a nuclear reactor

See also

 Reactive (disambiguation)
 Reactance (disambiguation)